The 2009 Women's Hockey SPAR Cup was an invitational international women's field hockey tournament, consisting of a series of test matches. The event, organised by the South African Hockey Association, was hosted in Durban from 2–6 June 2009, and featured four of the top nations in women's field hockey.

Australia won the tournament after defeating Argentina 3–1 in final.

Competition format
The tournament featured the national teams of Argentina, Australia, India, and the hosts, South Africa, competing in a round-robin format, with each team playing each other once. Three points will be awarded for a win, one for a draw, and none for a loss.

Results

Pool

Fixtures

Classification matches

Third and fourth place

Final

Statistics

Final standings

Goalscorers

References

SPAR Cup
SPAR Cup
International women's field hockey competitions hosted by South Africa
Hockey Spar Cup
Sports competitions in Durban
Hockey SPAR Cup